Dyurtyuli (Dürtöylö) is a rural locality (a selo) and the administrative centre of Kurmankeyevsky Selsoviet, Davlekanovsky District, Bashkortostan, Russia. The population was 317 as of 2010. There are 4 streets.

Geography 
Dyurtyuli is located 12 km southeast of Davlekanovo (the district's administrative centre) by road. Ibrayevo is the nearest rural locality.

References 

Rural localities in Davlekanovsky District